Arctoceras is a genus of ceratitid ammonoids from the Lower Triassic with a moderately narrow discoidal shell and ceratitic suture.

The shell of Arctoceras is generally involute with compressed whorls that are much higher than wide, flattened sides, narrowly rounded ventral rim, and sutures with wide low saddles and simple serrated lobes.

Arctoceras was named by Hyatt, (1900).  The genotype Arctoceras polaris (Mojsisovics) comes from Spitsbergen. Arctoceras is the type genus of the Arctoceratidae which is a family in the Meekocerataceae, a superfamily within the Ceratitida.  Ceratitids are ammonoid cephalopods, mostly from the Triassic but with ancestral forms in the Upper Permian. Meekocerataceae sometimes appears as Meekoceratoidea to conform with a recent ruling of the ICZN regarding superfamily endings.

Arctoceras has been reported from Canada, the United States, Russia, Australia, Afghanistan, and Malaysia.

References 

Ceratitida genera
Early Triassic ammonites
Ammonites of Australia